Attelabinae is a subfamily of leaf-rolling weevils in the beetle family Attelabidae. There are at least 20 genera and more than 690 described species in Attelabinae.

Genera
These genera belong to the subfamily Attelabinae:

 Allolabus Voss, 1925
 Attelabus Linnaeus 1758
 Clinolabus Jekel, 1860
 Cyrtolabus Voss, 1925
 Euops Schoenherr, 1839
 Euscelophilus Voss, 1925
 Euscelus Germar, 1833
 Henicolabus Voss, 1925
 Heterolabus Jekel, 1860
 Himatolabus Jekel, 1860
 Homoeolabus Jekel, 1860
 Hybolabus Jekel, 1860
 Lagenoderus White, 1841
 Lamprolabus Jekel, 1860
 Omolabus Jekel, 1860
 Phialodes Roelofs 1874
 Phymatopsinus Voss, 1925
 Pilolabus Jekel, 1860
 Pseudopilolabus Legalov 2003
 Synolabus Jekel, 1860
 Xestolabus Jekel, 1860

References

Further reading

 
 

Weevils
Beetle subfamilies